Eugene Harold Donaldson  (November 4, 1942 – September 7, 2002) was a Canadian and American football player who played for the Toronto Argonauts, Buffalo Bills and Hamilton Tiger-Cats. He won the Grey Cup with Hamilton in 1967. He previously played college football at Purdue University and was selected in the 1964 NFL draft by the Washington Redskins (Round 11, #143 overall).

References

1942 births
2002 deaths
American football running backs
Canadian football running backs
Purdue Boilermakers football players
Toronto Argonauts players
Buffalo Bills players
Hamilton Tiger-Cats players
Players of American football from Birmingham, Alabama
Players of Canadian football from Birmingham, Alabama
American Football League players